"Small Town" is a 1985 song by John Mellencamp.

Small Town may also refer to:

Music
 Small Town (album) or the title song, by Bill Frisell and Thomas Morgan, 2017
 Small Town, a 1976 orchestral composition by Peter Sculthorpe
 "Small Town", a song by Florida Georgia Line from Can't Say I Ain't Country
 "Smalltown", a song by Chumbawamba from Tubthumper
 "Elderly Woman Behind the Counter in a Small Town", a song by Pearl Jam, often referred to as "Small Town" by the band and its fans

Television
 "Small Town" (Sports Night), an episode
 Smalltown, a 2016 Irish mini-series directed by Gerard Barrett

See also
 Town
 Village
 Hamlet (place)